Oleksandr Kikhtenko is a Ukrainian military leader and politician. He is a career officer of the Internal Troops of Ukraine and a General of Army of Ukraine (2008).

He served in the army since 1974 first in the Soviet Army and then in the Ukrainian Army. In 1978 Kikhtenko graduated the Frunze College of General Command (Omsk). In 1991 he graduated the faculty of intelligence of the M. V. Frunze Military Academy (Moscow).

After fall of the Soviet Union, Kikhtenko continued to serve for the Armed Forces of Ukraine and was a chief of the Internal Troops administration in Zaporizhia Oblast. Since February 2005 he served as a Commander of the Internal Troops of Ukraine. During the presidential period of Viktor Yushchenko, in 2007-2008 and 2010 Kikhtenko unprecedentedly was a member of the National Security and Defense Council of Ukraine.

After election of Viktor Yanukovych as President of Ukraine in 2010, Kikhtenko was fired and retired from military service. On 10 October 2014 newly elected President of Ukraine Petro Poroshenko appointed Kikhtenko as a governor of Donetsk Oblast. In 2014 he also topped the party list of the Strength and Honor party for the Ukrainian parliamentary election.

On 11 June 2015 Kikhtenko was dismissed as a governor and replaced by Pavlo Zhebrivskyi.

References

External links
 Oleksandr Kikhtenko: Commander of the Internal Troops of Ukraine. Lenta.ru.

1956 births
Living people
People from Bohodukhiv
Frunze Military Academy alumni
Generals of the Army (Ukraine)
Governors of Donetsk Oblast
Recipients of the Order of Prince Yaroslav the Wise, 5th class
Recipients of the Order of Bohdan Khmelnytsky, 3rd class
Recipients of the Order of Bohdan Khmelnytsky, 2nd class
Recipients of the Order of Danylo Halytsky